Trahern is a surname. Notable people with the surname include:

Dallas Trahern (born 1985), American baseball pitcher
George Trahern (born 1936), American politician
Thomas Trahern (died 1542), English officer of arms

See also
Traherne